The 2016–17 Slovenian Basketball League, also known as Liga Nova KBM due to sponsorship reasons, was the 26th season of the Premier A Slovenian Basketball League.

Helios Suns were the defending champions. KK Union Olimpija won their 16th national title, defeating KK Rogaška 3–1 in the final.

Format
The 12 teams of the league play a double-legged round-robin competition where the six first qualified teams will join the playoffs for the title. The four last qualified teams will join the relegation group where the three worst qualified teams will be relegated.

Teams

Sixt Primorska was created after the merge of KOŠ Koper and KK Lastovka and occupied the place of this team in the league.

Personnel and kits

Managerial changes

Regular season

Second stage

Group for the title

Relegation group
Results of the first stage between teams involved counted for this stage.

Playoffs

The Playoffs began on Saturday, May 5, 2017 and concluded at May 24, 2017.

Awards

Regular Season MVP
 Jakob Čebašek (Hopsi)

Season MVP
 Igor Tratnik (Zlatorog)

Finals MVP
 Devin Oliver (Union Olimpija)

Weekly MVP

Regular season

Second round

Note

 – Co-MVP's were announced.

Statistical leaders

| width=50% valign=top |

Points

|}
|}

| width=50% valign=top |

Assists

|}
|}

References

External links
Slovenian Basketball Federation

Slovenian Basketball League seasons
Slovenia
1